Lovan may refer to:
 a trade name of fluoxetine, a pharmaceutical drug
 Lövəyin, Azerbaijan